Conocybe elegans is a mushroom species in the genus Conocybe found in Denmark.

References

External links 

 Conocybe elegans at mycobank.org (retrieved 9 April 2016)

Bolbitiaceae
Fungi described in 1983
Biota of Denmark
Taxa named by Roy Watling